Tso Moriri or Lake Moriri or "Mountain Lake", is a lake in the Changthang Plateau (literally: northern plains) of Ladakh in India. The lake and surrounding area are protected as the Tso Moriri Wetland Conservation Reserve.

It is the largest of the high altitude lakes entirely within India and entirely within Ladakh in this Trans-Himalayan biogeographic region. It is about 16 miles (26 km) north to south in length and two to three miles (3 to 5 km) wide. The lake has no outlet at present and the water is brackish though not very perceptible to taste.

The lake is fed by springs and snow-melt from the adjacent mountains. Most water enters the lake in two major stream systems, one entering the lake from the north, the other from the southwest. Both stream systems include extensive marshes where they enter the lake. It formerly had an outlet to the south, but this has become blocked and the lake has become an endorheic lake. The lake is oligotrophic in nature, and its waters are alkaline.

Accessibility to the lake is largely limited to summer season, though Karzok on the northwest shore and the military facilities on the eastern shores have year-round habitation.

Topography
As per a classification of the Himalayan Lakes done on the basis of their origin, there are four groups and Tso Moriri falls under the third group of "remnant lakes". The classification as reported states:  (i) Glacial lakes which are formed in and around glaciers; (ii) Structural lakes, formed by folds or faults due to movements in earth’s crust (e.g. Nainital lake in Uttarakhand), (iii) Remnant lakes which were originally structural but represent the remnants of vast lakes (e.g., Tso Moriri, Tso Kar, Pangong Tso in Ladakh, and Dal Lake in Kashmir), (iv) Natural dammed lakes i.e., temporary water bodies formed along the river courses due to deposition of rocks or debris e.g. Gohna Tal in Garhwal, Uttarakhand.
The Changthang Plateau in the eastern Ladakh represents a landscape of low productive ecosystems which protects unique floral and faunal species.  The area is an extension of the western Tibetan plateau that lies above  msl and supports diverse but low populations of several globally threatened mammals. The lake's basin could also be categorised as a basin since it is a closed drainage basin that retains water and allows no outflow to other bodies of water such as rivers or oceans.

The lake is 20 to 50 kilometers southeast of the elevated valley of the core Rupshu Valley and falls within the greater Rupshu Plateau and valley area. "Changpa", the nomadic migratory shepherds (pastoral community) of yak, sheep, goat, and horses of Tibetan origin and who are engaged in trade and work on caravans in Ladakh region, are the main inhabitants of the area. Changpa (Champa) herders use the land of this valley as grazing ground and for cultivation.

The Working Report (2006) of the Planning Commission of the Government of India also reports: Despite a poor vegetation cover, relatively low standing biomass and high anthropogenic pressure, this area sustains a considerably high livestock population. Steady increase in the livestock population in the area is mainly attributed to influx of nomadic herders from Tibet during recent decades and promotion of Pashmina goat production by the Animal Husbandry Department (AHD) for fine quality under wool (Pashmina). The herders and AHD officials, in recent years have begun to raise concern over degradation of pastures, resultant shortage of forage, and mass mortality of livestock during severe winters.
The Korzok Monastery, on the western bank of the lake is 400 years old and attracts tourists and Buddhist pilgrims. Tourism during May – September attracts large number of foreign and local tourists even though tented accommodation is the facility available, apart from a small PWD guest house close to the Lake.
Northeast of Tso Moriri is a small lake which is known locally as Lake of Joy.

Access 

The road is in a good condition for the most part. One can also reach Tsomoriri directly from the Pangong Tso via the remote Changtang region. This is considered to be one of the most beautiful drives in the entire Ladakh region. Foreigners are not allowed to go beyond the Man - Merak villages on Pangong Tso as permits are not issued for them. The distance between Pangong Tso and Tso Moriri is 235 km and there are no petrol pumps in the area. Carrying enough fuel is therefore necessary. Leh is also connected by air with many destinations in India.

Hydrology and water quality 

On the south, a nearly flat valley connects with but does not drain into or out of the Pare Chu river which is part of Sutlej river basin. Lingdi Nadi, major tributary of Tso Moriri, drains western catchment area of the lake and joins the lake on its south side. This valley contains the Nuro Sumdo wetlands (with a catchment area of ), a boggy area that mostly drains into the Pare Chu. Several small mountain streams feed the lake, including one through pasture land at Peldo Le. Aridity and cold desert conditions prevail in the lake region; with summer temperature varying from 0° to 30 °C (32° to 86 °F) and winter temperature recording −10° and −40 °C (14° to -40 °F). Geologically the lake is in Ordovician rock.

Fauna and flora

An avifaunal survey of the lake and its adjoining Nuro Sumdo wetland conducted in July 1996 revealed the following facts:

Avifauna
 Thirty-four species of birds included 14 species of water birds (some are pictured in the gallery) of which following are the vulnerable species
 Black-necked cranes (Grus nigricollis) endangered. 
 Bar-headed geese (Anser indicus)– only breeding ground in India
 Brown-headed gulls (Larus brunnicephalus)
 Great crested grebe (Podiceps cristatus) 
 Ferruginous pochard
 Black-necked grebe (Podiceps nigricollis)

Mammals 
 Tibetan gazelle, Procapra picticaudata, Goa antelope (threatened)
 Eurasian lynx
 Nayan Ovis ammon hodgsoni
 Bharal (Pseudois nayaur) Himalayan blue sheep
 Tibetan Ass (Kiang) or  Equus kiang, endemic to the Tibetan Plateau
 Great Tibetan Sheep
 One species of marmot, Marmota himalayana in large numbers seen on the hill slopes surrounding the lake and also along the roadsides
 One species of hare, Lepus oistolus
 One species of vole, Alticola roylei
 Three species of mouse hares, Ochotona macrotis, Ochotona curzoniae or Tibetan sand fox and Scincella ladacensis

Large carnivores
 Carnivores fauna reported are:
 the snow leopard (Uncia uncia)
 the Tibetan wolf (Canis lupus chanco)

Vegetation 
While the deeper parts of the lake have no vegetation, the shallow areas are reported to have Potamogeton sps. Marshes have several species of sedges and reeds, particularly Carex, Caragana and Astragalus sps., which are all representative of the surrounding arid steppe vegetation. Details of the Vegetation recorded in the area comprises the following:
 Characteristic Caragana and Astragalus species
 Potamogeton species
 Several species of Carex, Primula (low growing herb), and Pedicularis(parasitic plant)
 Common species of Juncus thomsonii and Leontopodium sp
Specimens of the diatom Cyclotella also recorded.
 Pastures for domestic livestock

Ramsar site 
Largely based on the ecological diversity of the Lake (explained in the previous section) and its surroundings, the Tsomiriri was notified in November 2002 under the List of Ramsar Wetland sites under the Ramsar Convention. The justification could be summarized as:
 The faunal collection is unique and has a large variety with endemic and vulnerable species
 The herbivore species are also endemic to the region
 The lake plays a fundamental role as breeding grounds and key staging posts on migration routes for several water birds belonging to six families, which is distinctive of wetland diversity and productivity

Threats to the lake 
 

There are a number of threats to the Lake, such as:

 Increase in the number of tourists visiting the lake affecting the breeding of avifauna
 Additional road construction along the lake
 Pasture degradation affecting wildlife, particularly wild herbivores (marmots, hares, ungulates)
 An increase in the grazing of sheep in the wetlands surrounding the lake
 The absence of a proper garbage disposal facility at the lake.
 Dogs kept by the people who live near the lake are known to attack the cranes and destroy their eggs.
 Jeep safaris have been known to chase wildlife such as kiang and approach close to the breeding ground.
 Lack of regulations and monitoring by the government.

Conservation efforts
The need for evolving a strategy and an action plan to preserve the extreme fragility of the lake ecosystem has been recognized with the needed emphasis at the National and International level to develop the lake conservation activity with participation of all stakeholders. The actions initiated in this direction are:

Tso Moriri is an administratively declared Wetland Reserve. Legally, shooting wildlife is prohibited. The State Department of Wildlife has set up a check post near Mahe Bridge at the entrance towards the lake.
WWF-India Project has established a field office at Korzok on the northwest shore of Tso Moriri for ‘Conservation of High Altitude Wetlands in Ladakh Region’ to carry out surveys, interact with tourists, tour guides, act as information centre and conduct education awareness programmes for locals, tourists etc.

Wildlife Institute of India has also set up a field station at Leh to carry out scientific research in the region. Nature clubs have been set up and Information booklet on the lake published. Efforts of WWF – India has also resulted in the local community declaring Tso Moriri as a ‘Sacred Gift for a Living Planet’ during the Annual Conference held in Nepal in November 2000.

Some of the other achievements so far reported on the Lake's conservation are:
 Regulation in consultation with local community Vehicular traffic flow and parking has been restructured with restriction of camping sites around the lake
 The Indo Tibetan Border Patrol (ITBP), tour operators and local population have introduced regular garbage cleanup operations
 Korzok community living around the lake has voluntarily built traditional and social fencing around the wetland to protect breeding and feeding grounds from vehicular traffic
 Tso Moriri Conservation Trust has been set up.
 Twenty Nature Clubs have been registered in different schools in Ladakh
The Indian Army has committed to support and set up a Nature Interpretation Centre at 'Hall of Fame', Leh.

World Wildlife Fund’s (WWF) role 
World Wildlife Fund for Nature — India (WWF-India) is spearheading the efforts at conservation of the Tso Moriri lake in particular, and the Ladakh region in general. WWF's activities as a NGO have spanned more than 30 years. The main objective set by WWF is the main activities planned for the Tso Moriri and other wetlands in Ladakh regions are:The Promotion of Nature Conservation and Environmental Protection as the Basis for Sustainable and Equitable Development.
 Evolve plan to establish a Sustainable Tourism Model managed by Local Communities at Tso Moriri
 Carry on with the biological and socio-economic surveys around selected wetlands and document for future reference
 Organize capacity building training programmes for Tour operators, Army, Teachers and local communities
 Frequent education and awareness Programmes for various target groups
 Management Planning for Tso Moriri and also Tsokar and Pangong Tso lakes by involving major stakeholders
 To set guidelines for introducing Eco-Tourism Certification Scheme in Ladakh
 To mobilise financial resources to carry out a comprehensive Strategic Environment Assessment
 Develop Environmental Management Systems, implement and certify the Environment Management Systems with special focus on tourism sector
 Maintain and enhance existing field presence at Tso Moriri, Leh, and Tsokar and increase presence at Chushul and Hanle marshes as well to achieve better results

See also
 Leh
 Ladakh
 Karzok
 Soda lake

References

External links 

 Tso Moriri Travel Guide 
 Government of Jammu & Kashmir, Department of Wildlife Protection, Wildlife Division (LAHDC), Leh Ladakh (Undated): Tso Moriri Wetland Conservation Reserve (The Wildlife Guide)
 Rizvi, J. (1996) Ladakh: Crossroads of High Asia, Oxford University Press, New Delhi, India
 Travel Article on Tso Moriri

Lakes of Ladakh
Ramsar sites in India
Protected areas of India
Tourism in Ladakh